Fire Fight is an isometric shoot 'em up video game developed by Polish studio Chaos Works, produced by Epic MegaGames and published by Electronic Arts for Windows.

Gameplay
Fire Fight is a two-dimensional top-down shooter.

Reception

Next Generation reviewed the PC version of the game, rating it four stars out of five, and stated that "This top-down two-dimensional blast fest has everything a good action game should – lots of weapons, intuitive control, and a ton of cool explosions."

Reviews
PC Gamer (1996 August)
PC Player (Germany) - Aug, 1996
PC Multimedia & Entertainment (Jul 09, 1996)
Gamesmania.de (1996)
The Adrenaline Vault (Jul 03, 1996)Joystick (French) (Jul, 1996)GameSpot'' (Jul 03, 1996)

References

1996 video games
Electronic Arts games
Multidirectional shooters
Video games developed in Poland
Video games with isometric graphics
Windows games
Windows-only games